Mir-Ebrahim Seyyed Hatami born in Ardabil, (1924 – 6 January 2019) was one of the high rank Ayatullah of Ardabil province, and a member of the Assembly of Experts.
He was a member of 3rd and 4th Assembly of Experts of Iran. Hatami died on January 6, 2019, and was buried the following day.

See also 
 List of Ayatollahs

References

1924 births
2019 deaths
Iranian ayatollahs
Members of the Assembly of Experts
People from Ardabil